CafeFX was an award-winning feature film visual effects facility offering visual effects production and supervision, CG character creation, and 3D animation. Founded in 1993 by Jeff Barnes and David Ebner, CafeFX was located in a  studio on an eight-acre campus in Santa Maria in Santa Barbara County. Its commercial and music video division, Santa Monica-based The Syndicate, was a creative design, branding services, and digital production studio, specializing in live action direction, visual effects, animation, motion graphics, and telecine. CafeFX and The Syndicate were held by umbrella corporation ComputerCafe Group, which has also established Sententia Entertainment, a long form production company.

History 

After founding the company in 1993 as Computer Café, Jeff Barnes and David Ebner began working in a small 10-by-10 room inside a local print design studio in Santa Maria. Their initial tools included two Amiga 2000 computers, a VHS deck, and Video Toaster. They used software such as Lightwave 3D, D-Paint, and Imagine 3D. Over the next 17-plus years, Computer Cafe would change its name and grow to one of the top visual effects studios in the world. Their first official employee was Ron Honn who acted as the company Designer and Storyboard artist. Soon to follow was VFX supervisor Tom Williamson, whose connection in the LA make-up effects industry helped to launch the group to the feature film market.

The team worked their way up from local to regional and then national commercial and broadcast assignments. “Our first job was to show how a product called Shoe Goo worked.” said Ebner "and then SLIME tires, some crazy projects back then." They soon expanded their client base, starting with an initial campaign on 24 spots for Foster's Freeze, and signing their first national contract for Shasta Soda. Shasta was the first US national ad spot to be fully rendered on a desktop PC. The team next steered its focus on broadcast work being represented by Our Gang Productions and studios such as Pittard Sullivan. During that time they produced various opens and TV station packages for both regional and nation clientele. Some projects include, NBC, TNT, Nickelodeon, CB S, Dateline, Entertainment Tonight and the long-running HBO Feature Presentation. Still under the banner of Computer Café, Jeff and David moved into motion picture effects with Clive Barker’s 1995 feature, Lord of Illusion. Even then, Barnes claimed “Everything we made, we put back into the company.”

In the late '90s, Barnes and Ebner were in a position to expand their operations. Interest in a Los Angeles outlet for their CG feature film work, together with a plan to expand commercially, led them to open their first LA location inside in Virgin Entertainment's 525 Post in Hollywood. A year later they expanded into their own space in Santa Monica where they opened a boutique CG and compositing studio which housed a staff of 8. In early 2002 they purchased Santa Monica based telecine company (then own by Neil Feldmen and called Pacific Data Post), added CG effects and compositing, and renamed the company 'The Syndicate.' The Syndicate was a short form visual effects company, providing Flame finishing suites, full CG services, and telecine studios, led by the management team of Kenny Solomon, Leslie Sorrentino and Beau Leon.

In 2005, Barnes and Ebner also launched Sentenia Entertainment, a live-action production company. Their first project with Sententia was as Associate Producers for Guillermo del Toro's Academy Award-winning "Pan's Labryinth." The following film was "Danika" starring Marisa Tomei, with Barnes and Ebner serving as the film's executive producers. In the same year, the pair purchased the new CafeFX studio.

The studio closed in 2010 after 17 years in business, citing the recession and the poor economy as the reasons for closure.

Filmography

Complete list 

2010 Love Ranch
2010 Harry Potter and the Forbidden Journey (short)
2010 Alice in Wonderland
2010 Shutter Island
2009 Whiteout
2009 The Final Destination
2009 G.I. Joe: The Rise of Cobra
2009 Dragonball Evolution
2008 Seven Pounds
2008 Red Cliff
2008 The Happening
2008 Speed Racer
2008 Iron Man
2008 John Adams (TV mini-series)
2008 Pathology
2008 Street Kings
2008 Nim's Island
2007 The Mist
2007 The Kite Runner
2007 Evan Almighty
2007 Fantastic Four: Rise of the Silver Surfer
2007 Spider-Man 3
2007 Ghost Rider
2006 Eragon
2006 The Good Shepherd
2006 The Departed
2006 Snakes on a Plane
2006 The Fast and the Furious: Tokyo Drift
2006 Pan's Labyrinth
2006 Scary Movie 4
2006 Art School Confidential
2006 Underworld: Evolution
2005 King Kong
2005 Memoirs of a Geisha
2005 Zathura
2005 Shopgirl
2005 Sin City
2005 Bad News Bears
2005 The Adventures of Sharkboy and Lavagirl
2005 Mr. & Mrs. Smith
2005 Planet Terror
2005 Are We There Yet?
2004 Flight of the Phoenix
2004 The Aviator
2004 Blade: Trinity
2004 The Dust Factory
2004 Sky Captain and the World of Tomorrow
2004 The Terminal
2004 Hellboy
2003 Master and Commander: The Far Side of the World
2003 Gothika
2003 Spy Kids 3-D: Game Over
2003 The League of Extraordinary Gentlemen
2003 Identity
2003 The Core
2002 Spy Kids 2: The Island of Lost Dreams
2002 Halloween: Resurrection
2002 Panic Room
2001 Impostor
2001 The One
2001 Megiddo: The Omega Code 2
2000 Dracula 2000
2000 Battlefield Earth
2000 The Crow: Salvation
2000 Waking the Dead
1999 Fever
1998 Armageddon
1998 Barney's Great Adventure
1998 Chairman of the Board
1997 Flubber
1997 Star Kid
1997 Wishmaster
1997 Sprung
1995 Lord of Illusions

Additional information 
CafeFX was also the sole provider of visual effects for Seven Pounds, a Sony Pictures Entertainment film starring Will Smith, which opens on December 19, 2008.

CafeFX completed work on approximately 100 shots for the film adaptation of the classic comic book, Ghost Rider, starring Nicolas Cage and Eva Mendes. The studio was called on to introduce the film's main villain—Blackheart—during a storm featuring fire rain and clouds with demon faces.

Snakes on a Plane- As the lead visual effects studio, CafeFX created more than half of the 500 VFX shots, including some 100 photoreal snake shots as well as all of the airline exteriors. CafeFX also handled all the airplane inflight exteriors shots and the Boeing's climactic emergency landing at LAX.

Pan's Labyrinth- Tasked with 300 shots and five months of post-production, the VFX crew worked to bring director Guillermo del Toro's visions to life. The production had very detailed storyboards and the team stuck to those designs "religiously."

2009 releases 
 Dragonball Evolution - 20th Century Fox, release date April 10, 2009
 Night at the Museum: Battle of the Smithsonian - 20th Century Fox, release date May 22, 2009
 Land of the Lost - Universal Pictures, release date June 5, 2009
 Public Enemies - Universal Pictures, release date July 1, 2009
 G.I. Joe: The Rise of Cobra - Paramount Pictures, release date August 7, 2009
 The Final Destination - New Line Cinema, release date August 21, 2009
 Whiteout - Warner Bros., release date September 11, 2009
 Shutter Island - Paramount Pictures, release date February 5, 2010

References

External links

Visual effects companies
Privately held companies based in California
Entertainment companies established in 1993
Entertainment companies disestablished in 2010
1993 establishments in California
2010 disestablishments in California
Companies based in Santa Barbara County, California